Sculptaria is a genus of small air-breathing land snails, and terrestrial pulmonate gastropod mollusks in the superfamily Plectopyloidea.

Sculptaria is the only genus in the family Sculptariidae. This family has no subfamilies (according to the taxonomy of the Gastropoda by Bouchet & Rocroi, 2005).

Distribution 
The distribution of Sculptaria includes south-western Africa.

Description 
The shell is small, discoidal, carinated, widely umbilicated. The last whorl is becoming free at the aperture. The aperture is very oblique, rounded, with continuous slightly expanded peristome, and having several teeth on the outer lip and an entering parietal lamina.

Genera 
Species within the genus Sculptaria include:
 Sculptaria chapmanni Ancey, 1890
 Sculptaria damarensis H. Adams, 1870
 Sculptaria damarensis damarensis H. Adams
 Sculptaria damarensis minor Degner
 Sculptaria damarensis pygmaea Zilch 1952
 Sculptaria edlingeri Connolly, 1938
 Sculptaria edlingeri edlingeri Connolly, 1938
 Sculptaria edlingeri plurilamellata Blume, 1952
 Sculptaria framesi Burnup, 1923
 Sculptaria fumarium van Bruggen & Rolán, 2003 - from Namibia
 Sculptaria gertenbachae Blume, 1963
 Sculptaria hoeschae Zilch, 1951
 Sculptaria kaokoensis Zilch 1952 - from Namibia
 Sculptaria leschkei Degner, 1922
 Sculptaria namaquensis Zilch, 1939 - from Namibia
 Sculptaria ohopohoensis Zilch, 1939
 Sculptaria planula Zilch, 1951
 Sculptaria pretiosa Zilch, 1939
 Sculptaria retisculpta v. Martens, 1889
 Sculptaria sculpturata (Gray, 1838) - type species
 Sculptaria sculpturata collaris Pfeiffer, 1867 / Sculptaria collaris - from southern Angola. The width of the shell is 6.4 mm. The height of the shell is 2 mm. The shell has 4.3 whorls. - drawing of the anatomy
 Sculptaria sculpturata collaris Pfeiffer, 1867
 Sculptaria sculpturata laevis Zilch 1939

References
This article incorporates public domain text from the reference

Further reading 
 (1910) "Note on Sculptaria, Pfeiffer". Journal of Molluscan Studies 9 (1): 34-36. abstract.

External links 

 
Gastropod genera
Taxa named by Ludwig Karl Georg Pfeiffer